The 1985 Cal State Hayward Pioneers football team represented California State University, Hayward—now known as California State University, East Bay—as a member of the Northern California Athletic Conference (NCAC) during the 1985 NCAA Division II football season. Led by 11th-year head coach Tim Tierney, Cal State Hayward compiled an overall record of 6–3–1 with a mark of 2–2–1 in conference play, placing third in the NCAC. The team outscored its opponents 282 to 205 for the season. The Pioneers played home games at Pioneer Stadium in Hayward, California.

Schedule

References

Cal State Hayward
Cal State Hayward Pioneers football seasons
Cal State Hayward Pioneers football